Forbes List can refer to one of the lists published annually by the American magazine Forbes, including:

 the Forbes 400 list of the wealthiest people in the United States.
 The World's Billionaires, a list of all the people with a net worth over US$1 billion.